Dr Walter Lee (1811 – 29 January 1887) was a 19th-century New Zealand politician.

Biography

Lee arrived in New Zealand in 1842. He represented the Northern Division (a territory north of Auckland but south of Whangarei) in the 1st Parliament and the 2nd Parliament; serving from 1853 to 1860, when he retired.

A Catholic, Lee opposed the reading of prayers at the start of Parliament, saying that any prayer would have an inevitable bias towards one faith or another.

Lee also served on the Auckland Provincial Council, representing the Northern Division electorate in 1857 and 1858. He was chairman of the initial Auckland City Council. He fell ill with a chronic liver disease and a week later, on 29 January 1887, he died from peritonitis. He was survived by his wife.

Notes

References

1811 births
1887 deaths
19th-century New Zealand politicians
Auckland City Councillors
Deaths from peritonitis
Members of the Auckland Provincial Council
Members of the New Zealand House of Representatives
New Zealand MPs for North Island electorates
New Zealand Roman Catholics
People from the Northland Region